The 1957 African Cup of Nations was the first edition of the Africa Cup of Nations, the football championship of Africa (CAF).  Hosted by Sudan, participating teams were Egypt, Sudan, and Ethiopia.

Overview 
South Africa was drawn to play Ethiopia in the semi-finals, but were disqualified due to apartheid. Ethiopia therefore had a bye to the final, whilst in the other semi-final at Municipal Stadium in Khartoum, the Egyptians beat the host nation 2–1. 

In the final, Egypt beat Ethiopia 4–0, with all four goals scored by El-Diba, who finished the tournament as top scorer with five goals. Only two games were played in this first edition.

Venues

Squads

Final tournament

Semifinals 

1 South Africa were disqualified due to the country's apartheid policies: CAF awarded Ethopia a 2–0 victory.

Final

Goalscorers 
5 goals
  Ad-Diba – four of the five goals were scored in Egypt's 4–0 defeat of Ethiopia in the final. 

1 goal
  Raafat Attia – first ever goal scorer in Africa Cup of Nations.
  Boraî Bashir — "some sources report the Sudan goal-scorer as Seddiq Mohammed Manzul, but contemporary reports mention that "Seddiq passed the ball to Boraî who scored."

References

External links 

 
Africa Cup of Nations tournaments
International association football competitions hosted by Sudan
Africa Cup Of Nations, 1957
Nations, 1957
Africa Cup of Nations